Montemurlo is a comune (municipality) in the Province of Prato in the Italian region Tuscany, located about  northwest of Florence and about  northwest of Prato.  
 
Montemurlo borders the following municipalities: Agliana, Cantagallo, Montale, Prato, Vaiano.

Main sights

Churches
Chapel at Javello farm
Chapel at the fortress in Montemurlo
Chapel at Villa del Barone in Bagnolo di Sopra
Chapel at Villa Giamari in Fornacelle
Parish Church of San Giovanni Battista Decollato at Montemurlo castle
Sacred Heart of Jesus in Montemurlo
San Pietro in Albiano
Santa Maria Maddalena de' Pazzi in Bagnolo
Holy Mary Mother of the Church in Oste
Holy Mary Mother of God in Fornacelle

Villas
Old Village Riva di Bagnolo in Bagnolo di Sopra
Casone dei Valori in Montemurlo castle
Javello farm
Palarciano farm in Montemurlo
The Fortress in Montemurlo castle
Villa del Barone
Villa Bresci in Bagnoli di Sopra
Villa in Campi Solari
Villa di Galceto in Bagnolo
Villa di Popolesco in Popolesco
Villa Gherardini in Montemurlo
Villa Giamari in Fornacelle
Villa Melchi in Borgo Forte
Villa Pazzi al Parugiano
Villa Strozzi in Bagnolo

Sport 

 A.S.D. Jolly Montemurlo

References

External links

 Official website